Peter Abelard (or Abailardus; 21 April 1142) was a medieval French scholastic philosopher, leading logician, theologian, poet, composer and musician.

In philosophy he is celebrated for his logical solution to the problem of universals via nominalism and conceptualism and his pioneering of intent in ethics. Often referred to as the "Descartes of the twelfth century", he is considered a forerunner of Rousseau, Kant, and Spinoza. He is sometimes credited as a chief forerunner of modern empiricism.

In history and popular culture, he is best known for his passionate and tragic love affair, and intense philosophical exchange, with his brilliant student and eventual wife, Héloïse d'Argenteuil. He was a defender of women and of their education. After having sent Héloïse to a convent in Brittany to protect her from her abusive uncle who did not want her to pursue this forbidden love, he was castrated by men sent by the uncle. Still considering herself as his spouse even though both retired to monasteries after this event, Héloïse publicly defended him when his doctrine was condemned by Pope Innocent II and Abelard considered a heretic. Among these opinions, Abelard professed the innocence of a woman who commits a sin out of love.

In Catholic theology, he is best known for his development of the concept of limbo, and his introduction of the moral influence theory of atonement. He is considered (alongside Augustine of Hippo) to be the most significant forerunner of the modern self-reflective autobiographer. He paved the way and set the tone for later epistolary novels and celebrity tell-alls with his publicly distributed letter, The History of My Calamities, and public correspondence.

In law, Abelard stressed that, because the subjective intention determines the moral value of human action, the legal consequence of an action is related to the person who commits it and not merely to the action. With this doctrine, Abelard created in the Middle Ages the idea of the individual subject central to modern law. This eventually gave to School of Notre-Dame de Paris (later the University of Paris) a recognition for its expertise in the area of Law (and later led to the creation of a Faculty of Law of Paris).

Life and career

Youth 
Abelard, originally called "Pierre le Pallet", was born  in Le Pallet, about 10 miles (16 km) east of Nantes, in the Duchy of Brittany, the eldest son of a minor noble French family. As a boy, he learned quickly. His father, a knight called Berenger, encouraged Abelard  to study the liberal arts, wherein he excelled at the art of dialectic (a branch of philosophy). Instead of entering a military career, as his father had done, Abelard became an academic.

During his early academic pursuits, Abelard wandered throughout France, debating and learning, so as (in his own words) "he became such a one as the Peripatetics." He first studied in the Loire area, where the nominalist Roscellinus of Compiègne, who had been accused of heresy by Anselm, was his teacher during this period.

Rise to fame 

Around 1100, Abelard's travels brought him to Paris. Around this time he changed his surname to Abelard, sometimes written Abailard or Abaelardus. The etymological root of Abelard could be the Middle French  ('ability'), the Hebrew name Abel/Habal (breath/vanity/figure in Genesis), the English apple or the Latin  ('to dance'). The name is jokingly referenced as relating to lard, as in excessive ("fatty") learning, in a secondary anecdote referencing Adelard of Bath and Peter Abelard (and in which they are confused to be one person).

In the great cathedral school of Notre-Dame de Paris (before the construction of the current cathedral there), he studied under Paris archdeacon and Notre-Dame master William of Champeaux, later bishop of Chalons, a disciple of Anselm of Laon (not to be confused with Saint Anselm), a leading proponent of philosophical realism. Retrospectively, Abelard portrays William as having turned from approval to hostility when Abelard proved soon able to defeat his master in argument. This resulted in a long duel that eventually ended in the downfall of the theory of realism which was replaced by Abelard's theory of conceptualism / nominalism. While Abelard's thought was closer to William's thought than this account might suggest, William thought Abelard was too arrogant. It was during this time that Abelard would provoke quarrels with both William and Roscellinus.

Against opposition from the metropolitan teacher, Abelard set up his own school, first at Melun, a favoured royal residence, then, around 1102–4, for more direct competition, he moved to Corbeil, nearer Paris. His teaching was notably successful, but the stress taxed his constitution, leading to a nervous breakdown and a trip home to Brittany for several years of recovery.

On his return, after 1108, he found William lecturing at the hermitage of Saint-Victor, just outside the Île de la Cité, and there they once again became rivals, with Abelard challenging William over his theory of universals. Abelard was once more victorious, and Abelard was almost able to attain the position of master at Notre Dame. For a short time, however, William was able to prevent Abelard from lecturing in Paris.

From his success in dialectic, he next turned to theology and in 1113 moved to Laon to attend the lectures of Anselm on Biblical exegesis and Christian doctrine. Unimpressed by Anselm's teaching, Abelard began to offer his own lectures on the book of Ezekiel. Anselm forbade him to continue this teaching. Abelard returned to Paris where, in around 1115, he became master of the cathedral school of Notre-Dame and a canon of Sens (the cathedral of the archdiocese to which Paris belonged).

Héloïse 
Héloïse d'Argenteuil lived within the precincts of Notre-Dame, under the care of her uncle, the secular canon Fulbert. She was famous as the most well-educated and intelligent woman in Paris, renowned for her knowledge of classical letters, including not only Latin but also Greek and Hebrew.

At the time Heloise met Abelard, he was surrounded by crowds — supposedly thousands of students — drawn from all countries by the fame of his teaching. Enriched by the offerings of his pupils, and entertained with universal admiration, he came to think of himself as the only undefeated philosopher in the world. But a change in his fortunes was at hand. In his devotion to science, he claimed to have lived a very straight and narrow life, enlivened only by philosophical debate: now, at the height of his fame, he encountered romance.

Upon deciding to pursue Héloïse, Abelard sought a place in Fulbert's house, and by in 1115 or 1116 began an affair. While in his autobiography he describes the relationship as a seduction, Heloise's letters contradict this and instead depict a relationship of equals kindled by mutual attraction. Abelard boasted of his conquest using example phrases in his teaching such as "Peter loves his girl" and writing popular poems and songs of his love that spread throughout the country. Once Fulbert found out, he separated them, but they continued to meet in secret. Héloïse became pregnant and was sent by Abelard to be looked after by his family in Brittany, where she gave birth to a son, whom she named Astrolabe, after the scientific instrument.

Tragic events 

To appease Fulbert, Abelard proposed a marriage. Héloïse initially opposed marriage, but to appease her worries about Abelard's career prospects as a married philosopher, the couple were married in secret (At this time, clerical celibacy was becoming the standard at higher levels in the church orders).
To avoid suspicion of involvement with Abelard, Heloise continued to stay at the house of her uncle. When Fulbert publicly disclosed the marriage, Héloïse vehemently denied it, arousing Fulbert's wrath and abuse. Abelard rescued her by sending her to the convent at Argenteuil, where she had been brought up, to protect her from her uncle. Héloïse dressed as a nun and shared the nun's life, though she was not consecrated.

Fulbert, infuriated that Heloise had been taken from his house and possibly believing that Abelard had disposed of her at Argenteuil in order to be rid of her, arranged for a band of men to break into Abelard's room one night and castrate him. In legal retribution for this vigilante attack, members of the band were punished, and Fulbert, scorned by the public, took temporary leave of his canon duties (he does not appear again in the Paris cartularies for several years).

In shame of his injuries, Abelard retired permanently as a Notre Dame canon, with any career as a priest or ambitions for higher office in the church shattered by his loss of manhood. He effectively hid himself as a monk at the monastery of St. Denis, near Paris, avoiding the questions of his horrified public. Roscellinus and Fulk of Deuil ridiculed and belittled Abelard for being castrated.

Upon joining the monastery at St. Denis, Abelard insisted that Héloïse take vows as a nun (she had few other options at the time). Héloïse protested her separation from Abelard, sending numerous letters re-initiating their friendship and demanding answers to theological questions concerning her new vocation.

Astrolabe, son of Abelard and Heloise 
Shortly after the birth of their child, Astrolabe, Heloise and Abelard were both cloistered. Their son was thus brought up by Abelard's sister (soror), Denise, at Abelard's childhood home in Le Pallet. His name derives from the astrolabe, a Persian astronomical instrument said to elegantly model the universe and which was popularized in France by Adelard of Bath. He is mentioned in Abelard's poem to his son, the Carmen Astralabium, and by Abelard's protector, Peter the Venerable of Cluny, who wrote to Héloise: "I will gladly do my best to obtain a prebend in one of the great churches for your Astrolabe, who is also ours for your sake".

'Petrus Astralabius' is recorded at the Cathedral of Nantes in 1150, and the same name appears again later at the Cistercian abbey at Hauterive in what is now Switzerland. Given the extreme eccentricity of the name, it is almost certain these references refer to the same person. Astrolabe is recorded as dying in the Paraclete necrology on 29 or 30 October, year unknown, appearing as "Petrus Astralabius magistri nostri Petri filius".

Later life 
In his early forties, Abelard sought to bury himself as a monk of the Abbey of Saint-Denis with his woes out of sight. Finding no respite in the cloister, and having gradually turned again to study, he gave in to urgent entreaties, and reopened his school at an unknown priory owned by the monastery. His lectures, now framed in a devotional spirit, and with lectures on theology as well as his previous lectures on logic, were once again heard by crowds of students, and his old influence seemed to have returned. Using his studies of the Bible and, in his view, inconsistent writings of the leaders of the church as his basis, he wrote Sic et Non (Yes and No).

No sooner had he published his theological lectures (the Theologia Summi Boni) than his adversaries picked up on his rationalistic interpretation of the Trinitarian dogma. Two pupils of Anselm of Laon, Alberich of Reims and Lotulf of Lombardy, instigated proceedings against Abelard, charging him with the heresy of Sabellius in a provincial synod held at Soissons in 1121. Through irregular procedures, they obtained an official condemnation of his teaching, and Abelard was made to burn the Theologia himself. He was then sentenced to perpetual confinement in a monastery other than his own, but it seems to have been agreed in advance that this sentence would be revoked almost immediately, because after a few days in the convent of St. Medard at Soissons, Abelard returned to St. Denis.

Life in his own monastery proved no more congenial than before. For this Abelard himself was partly responsible. He took a sort of malicious pleasure in irritating the monks. As if for the sake of a joke, he cited Bede to prove that the believed founder of the monastery of St. Denis, Dionysius the Areopagite had been Bishop of Corinth, while the other monks relied upon the statement of the Abbot Hilduin that he had been Bishop of Athens. When this historical heresy led to the inevitable persecution, Abelard wrote a letter to the Abbot Adam in which he preferred to the authority of Bede that of Eusebius of Caesarea's Historia Ecclesiastica and St. Jerome, according to whom Dionysius, Bishop of Corinth, was distinct from Dionysius the Areopagite, bishop of Athens and founder of the abbey;  although, in deference to Bede, he suggested that the Areopagite might also have been bishop of Corinth. Adam accused him of insulting both the monastery and the Kingdom of France (which had Denis as its patron saint); life in the monastery grew intolerable for Abelard, and he was finally allowed to leave.

Abelard initially lodged at St. Ayoul of Provins, where the prior was a friend. Then, after the death of Abbot Adam in March 1122, Abelard was able to gain permission from the new abbot, Suger, to live "in whatever solitary place he wished". In a deserted place near Nogent-sur-Seine in Champagne, he built a cabin of stubble and reeds, created a simple oratory dedicated to the Trinity, and became a hermit. When his retreat became known, students flocked from Paris, and covered the wilderness around him with their tents and huts. He began to teach again there. The oratory was rebuilt in wood and stone and rededicated as the Oratory of the Paraclete.

Abelard remained at the Paraclete for about five years. His combination of the teaching of secular arts with his profession as a monk was heavily criticized by other men of religion, and Abelard contemplated flight outside Christendom altogether. Abelard therefore decided to leave and find another refuge, accepting sometime between 1126 and 1128 an invitation to preside over the Abbey of Saint-Gildas-de-Rhuys on the far-off shore of Lower Brittany. The region was inhospitable, the domain a prey to outlaws, the house itself savage and disorderly. There, too, his relations with the community deteriorated.

Lack of success at St. Gildas made Abelard decide to take up public teaching again (although he remained for a few more years, officially, Abbot of St. Gildas). It is not entirely certain what he then did, but given that John of Salisbury heard Abelard lecture on dialectic in 1136, it is presumed that he returned to Paris and resumed teaching on the Montagne Sainte-Geneviève. His lectures were dominated by logic, at least until 1136, when he produced further drafts of his Theologia in which he analyzed the sources of belief in the Trinity and praised the pagan philosophers of classical antiquity for their virtues and for their discovery by the use of reason of many fundamental aspects of Christian revelation.

In 1128, Abbot Suger claimed that the convent at Argenteuil, where Héloïse was prioress, belonged to his abbey of St Denis. In 1129 he gained possession and he made no provision for the nuns. When Abelard heard, he transferred Paraclete and its lands to Héloïse and her remaining nuns, making her abbess. He provided the new community with a rule and with a justification of the nun's way of life; in this he emphasized the virtue of literary study. He also provided books of hymns he had composed, and in the early 1130s he and Héloïse composed a collection of their own love letters and religious correspondence containing, amongst other notable pieces, Abelard's most famous letter containing his autobiography, Historia Calamitatum (The History of My Calamities). This moved Héloïse to write her first Letter; the first being followed by the two other Letters, in which she finally accepted the part of resignation, which, now as a brother to a sister, Abelard commended to her. Sometime before 1140, Abelard published his masterpiece, Ethica or Scito te ipsum (Know Thyself), where he analyzes the idea of sin and that actions are not what a man will be judged for but intentions. During this period, he also wrote Dialogus inter Philosophum, Judaeum et Christianum (Dialogue between a Philosopher, a Jew, and a Christian), and also Expositio in Epistolam ad Romanos, a commentary on St. Paul's epistle to the Romans, where he expands on the meaning of Christ's life.

Conflicts with Bernard of Clairvaux 
After 1136, it is not clear whether Abelard had stopped teaching, or whether he perhaps continued with all except his lectures on logic until as late as 1141. Whatever the exact timing, a process was instigated by William of St-Thierry, who discovered what he considered to be heresies in some of Abelard's teaching. In spring 1140 he wrote to the Bishop of Chartres and to Bernard of Clairvaux, denouncing them. Another, less distinguished, theologian, Thomas of Morigny, also produced at the same time a list of Abelard's supposed heresies, perhaps at Bernard's instigation. Bernard's complaint mainly was that Abelard had applied logic where it is not applicable, and that is illogical.

Amid pressure from Bernard, Abelard challenged Bernard either to withdraw his accusations, or to make them publicly at the important church council at Sens planned for 2 June 1141. In so doing, Abelard put himself into the position of the wronged party and forced Bernard to defend himself from the accusation of slander. Bernard avoided this trap, however: on the eve of the council, he called a private meeting of the assembled bishops and persuaded them to condemn, one by one, each of the heretical propositions he attributed to Abelard. When Abelard appeared at the council the next day, he was presented with a list of condemned propositions imputed to him.

Unable to answer to these propositions, Abelard left the assembly, appealed to the Pope, and set off for Rome, hoping that the Pope would be more supportive. However, this hope was unfounded. On 16 July 1141, Pope Innocent II issued a bull excommunicating Abelard and his followers and imposing perpetual silence on him, and in a second document, he ordered Abelard to be confined in a monastery and his books to be burned. Abelard was saved from this sentence, however, by Peter the Venerable, abbot of Cluny. Abelard had stopped there, on his way to Rome, before the papal condemnation had reached France. Peter persuaded Abelard, already old, to give up his journey and stay at the monastery. Peter managed to arrange a reconciliation with Bernard, to have the sentence of excommunication lifted, and to persuade Innocent that it was enough if Abelard remained under the aegis of Cluny.

Abelard spent his final months at the priory of St. Marcel, near Chalon-sur-Saône, before he died on 21 April 1142. He is said to have uttered the last words "I don't know", before expiring. He died from a fever while suffering from a skin disorder, possibly mange or scurvy. Heloise and Peter of Cluny arranged with the Pope, after Abelard's death, to clear his name of heresy charges.

Disputed resting place/lovers' pilgrimage 

Abelard was first buried at St. Marcel, but his remains were soon carried off secretly to the Paraclete, and given over to the loving care of Héloïse, who in time came herself to rest beside them in 1163.

The bones of the pair were moved more than once afterwards, but they were preserved even through the vicissitudes of the French Revolution, and now are presumed to lie in the well-known tomb in Père Lachaise Cemetery in eastern Paris. The transfer of their remains there in 1817 is considered to have considerably contributed to the popularity of that cemetery, at the time still far outside the built-up area of Paris. By tradition, lovers or lovelorn singles leave letters at the crypt, in tribute to the couple or in hope of finding true love.

This second burial remains disputed. The Oratory of the Paraclete claims Abelard and Héloïse are buried there and that what exists in Père-Lachaise is merely a monument, or cenotaph. According to Père-Lachaise, the remains of both lovers were transferred from the Oratory in the early 19th century and reburied in the famous crypt on their grounds. Others believe that while Abelard is buried in the tomb at Père-Lachaise, Heloïse's remains are elsewhere.

Health issues 
Abelard suffered at least two nervous collapses, the first around 1104–5, cited as due to the stresses of too much study. In his words: "Not long afterward, though, my health broke down under the strain of too much study and I had to return home to Brittany. I was away from France for several years, bitterly missed..." His second documented collapse took place in 1141 at the Council of Sens, where he was accused of heresy and was unable to speak in reply. In the words of Geoffrey of Auxerre: his "memory became very confused, his reason blacked out and his interior sense forsook him."

Medieval understanding of mental health precedes development of modern psychiatric diagnosis. No diagnosis besides "ill health" was applied to Abelard at the time. His tendencies towards self-acclaim, grandiosity, paranoia and shame are suggestive of possible latent narcissism (despite his great talents and fame), or – recently conjectured – in keeping with his breakdowns, overwork, loquaciousness and belligerence – mood-related mental health issues such as mania related to bipolar disorder.

At the time, some of these characteristics were attributed disparagingly to his Breton heritage, his difficult "indomitable" personality and overwork.

Philosophical thought, and achievements

Philosophy

Abelard is considered one of the founders of the secular university and pre-Renaissance secular philosophical thought.

Abelard argued for conceptualism in the theory of universals. (A universal is a quality or property which every individual member of a class of things must possess if the same word is to apply to all the things in that class. Blueness, for example, is a universal property possessed by all blue objects.) According to Abelard scholar David Luscombe, "Abelard logically elaborated an independent philosophy of language...[in which] he stressed that language itself is not able to demonstrate the truth of things (res) that lie in the domain of physics."

Writing with the influence of his wife Heloise, he stressed that subjective intention determines the moral value of human action. With Heloise, he is the first significant philosopher of the Middle Ages to push for intentionalist ethics before Thomas Aquinas.

He helped establish the philosophical authority of Aristotle, which became firmly established in the half-century after his death. It was at this time that Aristotle's Organon first became available, and gradually all of Aristotle's other surviving works. Before this, the works of Plato formed the basis of support for philosophical realism.

Theology
Abelard is considered one of the greatest twelfth-century Catholic philosophers, arguing that God and the universe can and should be known via logic as well as via the emotions. He coined the term "theology" for the religious branch of philosophical tradition. He should not be read as a heretic, as his charges of heresy were dropped and rescinded by the Church after his death, but rather as a cutting-edge philosopher who pushed theology and philosophy to their limits. He is described as "the keenest thinker and boldest theologian of the 12th century" and as the greatest logician of the Middle Ages. "His genius was evident in all he did"; as the first to use 'theology' in its modern sense, he championed "reason in matters of faith", and "seemed larger than life to his contemporaries: his quick wit, sharp tongue, perfect memory, and boundless arrogance made him unbeatable in debate" — "the force of his personality impressed itself vividly on all with whom he came into contact."

Regarding the unbaptized who die in infancy, Abelard — in Commentaria in Epistolam Pauli ad Romanos — emphasized the goodness of God and interpreted Augustine's "mildest punishment" as the pain of loss at being denied the beatific vision (carentia visionis Dei), without hope of obtaining it, but with no additional punishments. His thought contributed to the forming of Limbo of Infants theory in the 12th–13th centuries.

Psychology 
Abelard was concerned with the concept of intent and inner life, developing an elementary theory of cognition in his Tractabus De Intellectibus, and later developing the concept that human beings "speak to God with their thoughts". He was one of the developers of the insanity defense, writing in Scito te ipsum, "Of this [sin], small children and of course insane people are untouched...lack[ing] reason....nothing is counted as sin for them". He spearheaded the idea that mental illness was a natural condition and "debunked the idea that the devil caused insanity", a point of view which Thomas F. Graham argues Abelard was unable to separate himself from objectively to argue more subtly "because of his own mental health."

Law 

Abelard stressed that subjective intention determines the moral value of human action and therefore that the legal consequence of an action is related to the person that commits it and not merely to the action. With this doctrine, Abelard created in the Middle Ages the idea of the individual subject central to modern law. This gave to School of Notre-Dame de Paris (later the University of Paris) a recognition for its expertise in the area of Law, even before the faculty of law existed and the school even recognized as an "universitas" and even if Abelard was a logician and a theologian.

The letters of Abelard and Héloïse 

The story of Abelard and Héloïse has proved immensely popular in modern European culture. This story is known almost entirely from a few sources: first, the Historia Calamitatum; secondly, the seven letters between Abelard and Héloïse which survive (three written by Abelard, and four by Héloïse), and always follow the Historia Calamitatum in the manuscript tradition; thirdly, four letters between Peter the Venerable and Héloïse (three by Peter, one by Héloïse). They are, in modern times, the best known and most widely translated parts of Abelard's work.

It is unclear quite how the letters of Abelard and Héloïse came to be preserved. There are brief and factual references to their relationship by 12th-century writers including William Godel and Walter Map. While the letters were most likely exchanged by horseman in a public (open letter) fashion readable by others at stops along the way (and thus explaining Heloise's interception of the Historia), it seems unlikely that the letters were widely known outside of their original travel range during the period. Rather, the earliest manuscripts of the letters are dated to the late 13th century. It therefore seems likely that the letters sent between Abelard and Héloïse were kept by Héloïse at the Paraclete along with the 'Letters of Direction', and that more than a century after her death they were brought to Paris and copied.

Shortly after the deaths of Abelard and Heloise, Chrétien de Troyes appears influenced by Heloise's letters and Abelard's castration in his depiction of the fisher king in his grail tales. In the fourteenth century, the story of their love affair was summarised by Jean de Meun in the Le Roman de la Rose.
Chaucer makes a brief reference in the Wife of Bath's Prologue (lines 677–8) and may base his character of the wife partially on Heloise. Petrarch owned an early 14th-century manuscript of the couple's letters (and wrote detailed approving notes in the margins).

The first Latin publication of the letters was in Paris in 1616, simultaneously in two editions. These editions gave rise to numerous translations of the letters into European languages – and consequent 18th- and 19th-century interest in the story of the medieval lovers. In the 18th century, the couple were revered as tragic lovers, who endured adversity in life but were united in death. With this reputation, they were the only individuals from the pre-Revolutionary period whose remains were given a place of honour at the newly founded cemetery of Père Lachaise in Paris. At this time, they were effectively revered as romantic saints; for some, they were forerunners of modernity, at odds with the ecclesiastical and monastic structures of their day and to be celebrated more for rejecting the traditions of the past than for any particular intellectual achievement.

The Historia was first published in 1841 by John Caspar Orelli of Turici. Then, in 1849, Victor Cousin published Petri Abaelardi opera, in part based on the two Paris editions of 1616 but also based on the reading of four manuscripts; this became the standard edition of the letters. Soon after, in 1855, Migne printed an expanded version of the 1616 edition under the title Opera Petri Abaelardi, without the name of Héloïse on the title page.

Critical editions of the Historia Calamitatum and the letters were subsequently published in the 1950s and 1960s. The most well-established documents, and correspondingly those whose authenticity has been disputed the longest, are the series of letters that begin with the Historia Calamitatum (counted as letter 1) and encompass four "personal letters" (numbered 2–5) and "letters of direction" (numbers 6–8).

Most scholars today accept these works as having been written by Héloïse and Abelard themselves. John Benton is the most prominent modern skeptic of these documents. Etienne Gilson, Peter Dronke, Constant Mews, and Mary Ellen Waithe maintain the mainstream view that the letters are genuine, arguing that the skeptical viewpoint is fueled in large part by its advocates' pre-conceived notions.

Lost love letters 

More recently, it has been argued that an anonymous series of letters, the Epistolae Duorum Amantium, were in fact written by Héloïse and Abelard during their initial romance (and, thus, before the later and more broadly known series of letters). This argument has been advanced by Constant J. Mews, based on earlier work by Ewad Könsgen. If genuine, these letters represent a significant expansion to the corpus of surviving writing by Héloïse, and thus open several new directions for further scholarship. However, because the attribution "is of necessity based on circumstantial rather than on absolute evidence," it is not accepted by all scholars.

Contemporary theology 
Novelist and Abelard scholar George Moore referred to Abelard as the "first protestant" prior to Martin Luther. While Abelard conflicted with the Church to the point of (later cleared) heresy charges, he never denied his Catholic faith.

Comments from Pope Benedict XVI 
During his general audience on 4 November 2009, Pope Benedict XVI talked about Saint Bernard of Clairvaux and Peter Abelard to illustrate differences in the monastic and scholastic approaches to theology in the 12th century. The Pope recalled that theology is the search for a rational understanding (if possible) of the mysteries of Christian revelation, which is believed through faith — faith that seeks intelligibility (fides quaerens intellectum). But St. Bernard, a representative of monastic theology, emphasized "faith" whereas Abelard, who is a scholastic, stressed "understanding through reason".

For Bernard of Clairvaux, faith is based on the testimony of Scripture and on the teaching of the Fathers of the Church. Thus, Bernard found it difficult to agree with Abelard and, in a more general way, with those who would subject the truths of faith to the critical examination of reason — an examination which, in his opinion, posed a grave danger: intellectualism, the relativizing of truth, and the questioning of the truths of faith themselves. Theology for Bernard could be nourished only in contemplative prayer, by the affective union of the heart and mind with God, with only one purpose: to promote the living, intimate experience of God; an aid to loving God ever more and ever better.

According to Pope Benedict XVI, an excessive use of philosophy rendered Abelard's doctrine of the Trinity fragile and, thus, his idea of God. In the field of morals, his teaching was vague, as he insisted on considering the intention of the subject as the only basis for describing the goodness or evil of moral acts, thereby ignoring the objective meaning and moral value of the acts, resulting in a dangerous subjectivism. But the Pope recognized the great achievements of Abelard, who made a decisive contribution to the development of scholastic theology, which eventually expressed itself in a more mature and fruitful way during the following century. And some of Abelard's insights should not be underestimated, for example, his affirmation that non-Christian religious traditions already contain some form of preparation for welcoming Christ.

Pope Benedict XVI concluded that Bernard's "theology of the heart" and Abelard's "theology of reason" represent the importance of healthy theological discussion and humble obedience to the authority of the Church, especially when the questions being debated have not been defined by the magisterium. St. Bernard, and even Abelard himself, always recognized without any hesitation the authority of the magisterium. Abelard showed humility in acknowledging his errors, and Bernard exercised great benevolence. The Pope emphasized, in the field of theology, there should be a balance between architectonic principles, which are given through Revelation and which always maintain their primary importance, and the interpretative principles proposed by philosophy (that is, by reason), which have an important function, but only as a tool. When the balance breaks down, theological reflection runs the risk of becoming marred by error; it is then up to the magisterium to exercise the needed service to truth, for which it is responsible.

Poetry and music 
Abelard was also long known as an important poet and composer. He composed some celebrated love songs for Héloïse that are now lost, and which have not been identified in the anonymous repertoire. (One known romantic poem / possible lyric remains, "Dull is the Star".) Héloïse praised these songs in a letter: "The great charm and sweetness in language and music, and a soft attractiveness of the melody obliged even the unlettered". His education in music was based in his childhood learning of the traditional quadrivium studied at the time by almost all aspiring medieval scholars.

Abelard composed a hymnbook for the religious community that Héloïse joined. This hymnbook, written after 1130, differed from contemporary hymnals, such as that of Bernard of Clairvaux, in that Abelard used completely new and homogeneous material. The songs were grouped by metre, which meant that it was possible to use comparatively few melodies. Only one melody from this hymnal survives, O quanta qualia.

Abelard also wrote six biblical planctus (laments):
 Planctus Dinae filiae Iacob; inc.: Abrahae proles Israel nata (Planctus I)
 Planctus Iacob super filios suos; inc.: Infelices filii, patri nati misero (Planctus II)
 Planctus virginum Israel super filia Jepte Galadite; inc.: Ad festas choreas celibes (Planctus III)
 Planctus Israel super Samson; inc.: Abissus vere multa (Planctus IV)
 Planctus David super Abner, filio Neronis, quem Ioab occidit; inc.: Abner fidelissime (Planctus V)
 Planctus David super Saul et Jonatha; inc.: Dolorum solatium (Planctus VI).

In surviving manuscripts, these pieces have been notated in diastematic neumes which resist reliable transcription. Only Planctus VI was fixed in square notation. Planctus as genre influenced the subsequent development of the lai, a song form that flourished in northern Europe in the 13th and 14th centuries.

Melodies that have survived have been praised as "flexible, expressive melodies [that] show an elegance and technical adroitness that are very similar to the qualities that have been long admired in Abelard's poetry."

Works

List of works 
 Logica ingredientibus ("Logic for Advanced") completed before 1121
 Petri Abaelardi Glossae in Porphyrium ("The Glosses of Peter Abailard on Porphyry"), c. 1120
 Dialectica, before 1125 (1115–1116 according to John Marenbon, The Philosophy of Peter Abelard, Cambridge University Press 1997).
 Logica nostrorum petitioni sociorum ("Logic in response to the request of our comrades"), c. 1124–1125
 Tractatus de intellectibus ("A treatise on understanding"), written before 1128.
 Sic et Non ("Yes and No") (A list of quotations from Christian authorities on philosophical and theological questions)
 Theologia 'Summi Boni', Theologia christiana, and Theologia 'scholarium'. His main work on systematic theology, written between 1120 and 1140, and which appeared in a number of versions under a number of titles (shown in chronological order)
 Dialogus inter philosophum, Judaeum, et Christianum, (Dialogue of a Philosopher with a Jew and a Christian) 1136–1139.
 Ethica or Scito Te Ipsum ("Ethics" or "Know Yourself"), before 1140.

Modern editions and translations 
 
 
 
 
 Abelard, Peter and Heloise. (2009) The Letters of Heloise and Abelard. Translated by Mary McGlaughlin and Bonnie Wheeler.
 Planctus. Consolatoria, Confessio fidei, by M. Sannelli, La Finestra editrice, Lavis 2013, 
 Carmen Ad Astralabium, in: Ruys J.F. (2014) Carmen ad Astralabium—English Translation. The Repentant Abelard. The New Middle Ages. Palgrave Macmillan, New York. https://doi.org/10.1057/9781137051875_5
 The letter collection of Peter Abaelard and Heloise. (2017) Edited and translated by Peter Luscombe. Oxford Medieval Texts

Cultural references

In literature
Jean-Jacques Rousseau's novel Julie, ou la nouvelle Héloïse refers to the history of Héloïse and Abélard.
Mark Twain's comedic travelogue The Innocents Abroad (1869) tells a satirical version of the story of Abélard and Héloïse.
Étienne Gilson's historical and philosophical account of their lives, "Héloïse et Abélard", was published in France, 1938, and translated into English for a 1960 edition by the University of Michigan Press, as "Heloise and Abelard". 
Lauren Groff's short story "L. DeBard and Aliette" from her collection Delicate Edible Birds recreates the story of Héloïse and Abélard, set in 1918 New York.
George Moore's 1921 novel Heloise and Abelard treats their entire relationship from first meeting through final parting.
Charles Williams' 1931 novel The Place of the Lion features a character Damaris who focuses her research on Peter Abelard.
Helen Waddell's novel Peter Abelard depicts the romance between the two.
Marion Meade's novel Stealing Heaven depicts the romance and was adapted into a film.
Sharan Newman's Catherine LeVendeur series of medieval mysteries feature Héloïse, Abélard and Astrolabe as occasional characters, mentors and friends of the main character, formerly a novice at the Paraclete.
Sherry Jones's 2014 novel The Sharp Hook of Love is a fictional account of Abélard and Héloïse.
Mandy Hager's 2017 novel Heloise tells Heloise's story from childhood to death, with frequent reference to their writings.
Rick Riordan's 2017 book The Dark Prophecy has a pair of gryphons named Heloise and Abelard.
Luise Rinser's novel Abaelard's Liebe (German) depicts the love story of Héloïse and Abelard from the perspective of their son, Astrolabe.
Dodie Smith's novel I Capture the Castle features a dog and a cat named Héloïse and Abélard.
Abelard and Héloïse are referenced throughout Robertson Davies's novel The Rebel Angels.
Henry Adams devotes a chapter to Abelard's life in Mont Saint Michel and Chartres.
James Carroll's 2017 novel The Cloister retells the story of Abelard and Héloïse, interweaving it with the friendship of a Catholic priest and a French Jewish woman in the post-Holocaust twentieth century.
Melvyn Bragg's 2019 novel Love Without End intertwines the legendary medieval romance of Héloïse and Abélard with a modern-day historian's struggle to reconcile with his daughter.

In art
 Héloïse et Abeilard, oil on copper, Jean-Baptiste Goyet, 1830.
 Abaelardus and Heloïse surprised by Master Fulbert, oil, by Romanticist painter Jean Vignaud, 1819
 Abelard, teaching, mural at the Sorbonne by Francois Flameng
 Monument to Abelard and Heloise at Le Pallet by Sylviane and Bilal Hassan-Courgeau
 Abelard & Heloise, painting by Salvador Dalí

In music
"Heloise and Abelard", a song written by SCA bard Efenwealt Wystle (aka Scott Vaughan)
Abelard and Heloise is a 1970 soundtrack album by the British Third Ear Band.
The lyrics of "Abelard and Heloise", featured on Seventh Angel's album The Dust of Years, are based on the couple's famous correspondence.
The song "Heloise" by Frank Black, from the album Devil's Workshop, refers to this story.
Scritti Politti's song, "The World You Understand (Is Over + Over + Over)", refers to this story and the interment of the two lovers at Pere Lachaise cemetery.
The intro to the Cole Porter song "Just One of Those Things" includes "As Abelard said to Heloise, Don't forget to drop a line to me please".
The song "World Without" by A Fine Frenzy (Alison Sudol) references them: "And Heloise, gave her whole heart to Pete, now eternally sleeps by his side"

In poetry
François Villon mentions Héloïse and Abelard in his most famous poem "Ballade des dames du temps jadis".
Their story is referenced in the poem "The Convent Threshold", by the Victorian English poet Christina Rossetti.
Their story is referenced in "Eloisa to Abelard", by the English poet Alexander Pope.
Robert Lowell's poem "Eloise and Abelard" in his poetry collection History (1973) portrays the lovers post-separation.

Onstage and onscreen

Ronald Millar's play Abelard & Heloise was a 1971 Broadway production at the Brooks Atkinson Theatre, starring Diana Rigg and Keith Michell, script published by Samuel French, Inc, London, 1970.
The film Stealing Heaven (1988) chronicles their story and stars Derek de Lint, Kim Thomson and Denholm Elliott.
In the 58th episode of The Sopranos ("Sentimental Education"), Carmela Soprano finds a copy of The Letters of Abelard & Héloïse while using Mr. Wegler's bathroom. The book alludes both to the impossibility of Carmela and Mr. Wegler's romantic affair, and arguably, and ironically, to the doomed platonic love between Carmela and her daughter, Meadow: for many years it was a mother-daughter tradition to have tea under the portrait of Eloise at the Plaza Hotel.
 Anne Carson's 2005 collection Decreation includes a screenplay about Abelard and Héloïse.
 Henry Miller uses Abelard's "Foreword to Historia Calamitatum" as the motto of Tropic of Capricorn (1938).
 Howard Brenton's play In Extremis: The Story of Abelard & Heloise was premiered at Shakespeare's Globe in 2006.
 In Being John Malkovich, John Cusack's character performs a puppet show of Abelard & Heloise on a street corner, which gets him beaten up by an irate father due to its sexual suggestiveness.
 Michael Shenefelt's stage play, Heloise, 2019

See also
Héloïse
Peter the Venerable
Bernard of Clairvaux
Astrolabe
Stealing Heaven

References

Further reading 
 
 
 
 Bell, Thomas J. Peter Abelard after Marriage. The Spiritual Direction of Héloïse and Her Nuns through Liturgical Song, Cistercian Studies Series 21, (Kalamazoo, Michigan, Cistercian Publications. 2007).

External links 

 
 
 New Advent Catholic Encyclopedia: Peter Abelard
 Jewish Encyclopedia: Peter Abelard
 Abelard: Logic, Semantics, Ontology and His Theories of the Copula
 Abelard and Héloïse from In Our Time
 The Love Letters of Abelard and Héloïse. Trans. by Anonymous (1901).
 
 
 

1070s births
1142 deaths
11th-century Breton people
12th-century Breton people
12th-century French philosophers
12th-century French composers
12th-century French poets
12th-century French Catholic theologians
12th-century Latin writers
People from Loire-Atlantique
Medieval French theologians
Burials at Père Lachaise Cemetery
Castrated people
Medieval Latin poets
French logicians
Linguists from France
Philosophers of language
Scholastic philosophers
French Benedictines
Benedictine philosophers
Christian ethicists
Medieval Paris
French male poets
French classical composers
French male classical composers
Medieval male composers
Empiricists
Limbo